Cymindoidea is a genus of beetles in the family Carabidae, containing the following species:

 Cymindoidea aequa Andrewes, 1923 
 Cymindoidea bisignata (Dejean, 1831) 
 Cymindoidea chinensis Jedlicka, 1953  
 Cymindoidea decellei Basilewsky, 1961 
 Cymindoidea deplanata (Boheman, 1848) 
 Cymindoidea distigma Chaudoir, 1875 
 Cymindoidea humeralis Peringuey, 1899 
 Cymindoidea indica (Schmidt-Goebel, 1846) 
 Cymindoidea kochi Basilewsky, 1961 
 Cymindoidea munda Andrewes, 1923 
 Cymindoidea nigra Chaudoir, 1875 
 Cymindoidea regularis Basilewsky, 1961 
 Cymindoidea triangulifera (Buquet, 1835) 
 Cymindoidea tutelina (Buquet, 1835) 
 Cymindoidea virgulifera Chaudoir, 1875

References

Lebiinae